Tulsa Driller may refer to:

 Golden Driller, a statue in Tulsa
 Tulsa Drillers, minor league baseball team in Tulsa